The 6th Parliament of Antigua and Barbuda was elected on Wednesday, 18 February 1976, and dissolved on Saturday, 5 April 1980.

Members

Senate 
Unknown

House of Representatives 

Speaker: Hon. Casford L. Murray

References 

Parliaments of Antigua and Barbuda